The men's pole vault event at the 2005 Summer Universiade was held on 16–18 August in Izmir, Turkey.

Medalists

Results

Qualification

Final

References
Finals results
Full results
Qualification results

Athletics at the 2005 Summer Universiade
2005